Bis-GMA (bisphenol A-glycidyl methacrylate) is a resin commonly used in dental composite, dental sealants. and dental cement. It is the diester derived from methacrylic acid and the bisphenol A diglycidyl ether.  Bearing two polymerizable groups, it is prone to form a crosslinked polymer that is used in dental restorations.  For dental work, highly viscous bis-GMA is mixed with aluminosilicate particles, crushed quartz and other related acrylates; changes to component ratios lead to different physical properties in the end product. Bis-GMA was incorporated into composite dental resins in 1962 by Rafael Bowen.  Until matrix development work in the early 2000s, bis-GMA and related methacrylate monomers were the only options for organic matrix composition.

Safety
Concerns have been raised about the potential for bis-GMA to break down into or be contaminated with the related compound bisphenol A. However, no negative health effects of bis-GMA use in dental resins have been found.

Composition
Salivary esterases can slowly degrade bis-GMA-based sealants, forming Bis-HPPP.

References

Further reading 
 

Dental materials
2,2-Bis(4-hydroxyphenyl)propanes
Enones